Starport: Galactic Empires is a free, space-oriented, massively multiplayer online role-playing game by American studio Playtechtonics which uses a third-person overhead view similar to that used in Asteroids. The game uses realistic 2-dimensional physics for both space and atmospheric travel, affecting both the movement of ships and player-fired weaponry. Characters can conquer and colonize planets with a variety of different terrains depending on the type of planet. The player can harvest resources, generate money, and produce weapons with their colony. Starport shares many core concepts with Tradewars 2002, notably the commodity trading and planet controlling aspects.

Pricing
Starport is notable in the MMORPG genre as being one of the earliest adopters of the free to play business model. Instead of charging players a monthly subscription fee, Starport is free to play and allows players to purchase extra resources in the game through a feature called "The Admiral's Club."

Gameplay
Players are given a spaceship to travel through galaxies to either trade, pvp (player versus player) real-time combat, or create colonies for income. Players are also able to take over other people's colonies by breaching defenses and capturing the biodome, wherever it has been placed on the planet surface terrain map. Commodities play a large role in the universal economy, with different means of obtaining them either through trade, colonies or pvp.

References

External links 
 Official Starport: Galactic Empires Website

2004 video games
Space massively multiplayer online role-playing games
Windows games
Windows-only games
Space trading and combat simulators
Massively multiplayer online role-playing games
Video games developed in the United States